Ádám Présinger (born 26 January 1989) is a Hungarian football player who plays for Ajka.

Honours

 FIFA U-20 World Cup:
Third place: 2009

References

External links
 

1989 births
Living people
People from Pápa
Hungarian footballers
Hungary youth international footballers
Hungary under-21 international footballers
Association football defenders
MTK Budapest FC players
Integrál-DAC footballers
Pécsi MFC players
Fehérvár FC players
Vasas SC players
Lombard-Pápa TFC footballers
Gyirmót FC Győr players
FC Ajka players
Nemzeti Bajnokság I players
Nemzeti Bajnokság II players
Sportspeople from Veszprém County